Morusumilli also called Morusumalli is a village in Mylavaram mandal, NTR District in the Indian state of Andhra Pradesh. It belongs to Andhra region.

Geography 
It is located 99 km from district headquarters Machilipatnam, 279 km from Hyderabad, 15 km from sub-district headquarters Mylavaram, and 135 km from district headquarter Machilipatnam.

Morsumilli is north of G. Konduru Mandal, south of Reddigudem Mandal, west of Agiripalli Mandal and east of Yerrupalem Mandal.

Nuzvid, Vijayawada, Hanuman Junction and Mangalagiri are nearby cities.	

Morusumilli is on the border between Krishna District and Khammam District. Khammam District Yerrupalem is west towards this place . It is near the Telangana.

Transport
Road links are connect from Vijayawada to Morsumilli.  Bus stations are located in Mylavaram, Madhira, Vijayawada.

Education

Colleges 
Nearby colleges include:

 Lakireddy Bali Reddy college of engineering, mylavaram (LBRCE)
 Govt Degree College Mylavaram
 Sri Rajah Svrgnr Jr College, Mylavaram 
 Little Flower Jr College Mylavaram
 V V R Govt Jr College Mylavaram
 Sri Raja Svrgnr College of Arts & Science

Schools 
 Viswabharathi Ups
 Mpups Morusumilli

References

Villages in NTR district